Chlamys islandica, the Iceland scallop, is a species of bivalve mollusc in the family Pectinidae.

In the northwest, it ranges from Greenland to Massachusetts and in the northeast from Norway and Iceland to the Faroes. Its shell can be found further south, including the British Isles, as subfossil remains.

References

Molluscs described in 1776
islandica
Taxa named by Otto Friedrich Müller